Ctenophorus chapmani, commonly known as Chapman's dragon, southern heath dragon, or Bight heath dragon, is a species of agamid lizard occurring in sandplains with heath or mallee across southern Australia.

It was formerly considered to be a subspecies of Ctenophorus adelaidensis.

References

Agamid lizards of Australia
chapmani
Endemic fauna of Australia
Reptiles described in 1977
Taxa named by Glen Milton Storr